Abacetus percoides is a species of ground beetle in the subfamily Pterostichinae. It was described by Fairmaire in 1868.

References

percoides
Beetles described in 1868